Oval Invincibles is a franchise 100-ball cricket side based in South London. The team represents the historic counties of Surrey and Kent in the newly founded The Hundred competition, which took place for the first time during the 2021 English and Welsh cricket season. Both the men's side and the women's side plays at The Oval.

History 

The announcement of the new eight-team men's and women's tournament series in 2019 was not without controversy, with the likes of Virat Kohli criticising the England and Wales Cricket Board for pursuing a shift away from Test cricket, while others argued the format should have followed the established and successful Twenty20 format. The ECB however decided it needed a more unique format to draw crowds.

In August 2019, the side announced that Australian coach Tom Moody would be the men's team's first coach, while former England Women player Lydia Greenway was appointed coach of the Women's team.

The inaugural Hundred draft took place in October 2019 and saw the Invincibles claim Sam Curran as their headline men's draftee, and Laura Marsh as the women's headliner. They were joined by England internationals Tom Curran and Jason Roy for the men's team, while Fran Wilson joined Marsh in the women's side.

Honours

Men's honours 

The Hundred
4th place: 2021 (highest finish)

Women's honours 

The Hundred
Winners: 2021, 2022

Ground 

Both the Oval Invincibles men's and women's sides play at the home of Surrey, The Oval, in the Kennington area of London. 

The women's side had been due to play at the County Ground in Beckenham, one of the outgrounds of Kent County Cricket Club, but both teams were brought together at the same location as a result of the Covid-19 pandemic.

Players

Current squad

Men's side 
 Bold denotes players with international caps.
  denotes a player who is unavailable for rest of the season.

Men's captains
 Italics denote a temporary captain when the main captain was unavailable.

Women's side 
 Bold denotes players with international caps.
  denotes a player who is unavailable for rest of the season.

Women's captains
 Italics denote a temporary captain when the main captain was unavailable.

Seasons

Group stages

Knockout rounds

See also 

 List of Oval Invincibles cricketers
 List of cricket grounds in England and Wales
 List of Test cricket grounds

References

Further reading 

 BBC: The Hundred player draft – covering the first draft signings for each region's team

External links 

 Official web page

Surrey County Cricket Club
Kent County Cricket Club
Cricket in Surrey
Cricket in Kent
Sport in London
Sport in Kent
The Hundred (cricket) teams
2019 establishments in England
Cricket clubs established in 2019
Oval Invincibles